Kalamazoo is a city in the southwest region of the U.S. state of Michigan. It is the county seat of Kalamazoo County. At the 2010 census, Kalamazoo had a population of 74,262. Kalamazoo is the major city of the Kalamazoo-Portage Metropolitan Statistical Area, which had a population of 335,340 in 2015.

One of Kalamazoo's most notable features is the Kalamazoo Mall, an outdoor pedestrian shopping mall. The city created the mall in 1959 by closing part of Burdick Street to auto traffic, although two of the mall's four blocks have been reopened to auto traffic since 1999. Kalamazoo is home to Western Michigan University, a large public university, Kalamazoo College, a private liberal arts college, and Kalamazoo Valley Community College, a two-year community college.

Name origin 

Originally known as Bronson (after founder Titus Bronson) in the township of Arcadia, the names of both the city and the township were changed to "Kalamazoo" in 1836 and 1837, respectively. The name “Kalamazoo” comes from a Potawatomi word, first found in a British report in 1772. The Kalamazoo River, which passes through the modern city of Kalamazoo, was located on the route between Detroit and Fort Saint-Joseph (nowadays Niles, Michigan). French-Canadian traders, missionaries, and military personnel were quite familiar with this area during the French era and thereafter. The Kalamazoo River was then known by Canadians and French as La rivière Kikanamaso.  The name "Kikanamaso" was also recorded by Father Pierre Potier, a Jesuit missionary for the Huron-Wendats at the Assumption mission (south shore of Detroit), while en route to Fort Saint-Joseph during the fall of 1760. Legend has it that "Ki-ka-ma-sung", meaning "boiling water", referred to a footrace held each fall by local Native Americans, in which participants had to run to the river and back before a pot boiled.  The word negikanamazo, purported to mean "otter tail" or "stones like otters", has also been cited as a possible origin of the name. Another theory is that it means "the mirage or reflecting river". Another legend is that the image of "boiling water" referred to fog on the river as seen from the hills above the current downtown. The name was also given to the river that flows almost all the way across the state.

The name Kalamazoo, which sounds unusual to English speakers, has become a metonym for exotic places, as in the phrase "from Timbuktu to Kalamazoo".  Today, T-shirts are sold in Kalamazoo with the phrase "Yes, there really is a Kalamazoo".

History 
The area on which the modern city of Kalamazoo stands was once home to Native Americans of the Hopewell tradition, who migrated into the area sometime before the first millennium. Evidence of their early residency remains in the form of a small mound in downtown's Bronson Park. The Hopewell civilization began to decline after the 8th century and was replaced by other groups. The Potawatomi culture lived in the area when the first European explorers arrived.

René-Robert Cavelier, Sieur de La Salle, passed just southeast of the present city of Kalamazoo in late March 1680. The first Europeans to reside in the area were itinerant fur traders in the late 18th and early 19th century. There are records of several traders wintering in the area, and by the 1820s at least one trading post had been established.

During the War of 1812, the British established a smithy and a prison camp in the area.

The 1821 Treaty of Chicago ceded the territory south of the Grand River to the United States federal government. However, the area around present-day Kalamazoo was reserved as the village of Potawatomi Chief Match-E-Be-Nash-She-Wish. Six years later, as a result of the 1827 Treaty of St. Joseph, the tract that became the city of Kalamazoo was also ceded.

In 1829, Titus Bronson, originally from Connecticut, became the first white settler to build a cabin within the present city limits of Kalamazoo.

Bronson, frequently described as "eccentric" and argumentative, was later run out of town. The village was renamed Kalamazoo in 1836, due in part to Bronson's being fined for stealing a cherry tree. Today, a hospital and a downtown park, among other things, are named for Bronson. Kalamazoo was legally incorporated as a village in 1838 and as a city in 1883.

The fertile farmlands attracted prosperous Yankee farmers who settled the surrounding area, and sent their sons to Kalamazoo to become businessmen, professionals and entrepreneurs who started numerous factories.  Most of the original settlers of Kalamazoo were New Englanders or were from upstate New York.

On August, 27, 1856, Abraham Lincoln gave a speech in Kalamazoo during a campaign rally for John C. Fremont, the first Republican presidential candidate.  The text of the speech was found by Lincoln historian Thomas I. Starr in a copy of the Detroit Daily Advertiser and published in a booklet. This was the only trip Lincoln ever made to Michigan.  In July, 2022, a local non-profit, the Kalamazoo Abraham Lincoln Institute was given permission by the city to place a statue of Lincoln in Bronson Park to commemorate the event.

In the 1940s, the city became the first to install curb cuts.

In 1959, the city created the Kalamazoo Mall, the first outdoor pedestrian shopping mall in the United States, by closing part of Burdick Street to auto traffic. The Mall was designed by Victor Gruen, who also designed the country's first enclosed shopping mall, which had opened three years earlier. Two of the mall's four blocks were reopened to auto traffic in 1999 after much debate.

An F3 tornado struck downtown Kalamazoo on May 13, 1980, killing five and injuring 79.

On February 20, 2016, Kalamazoo became the site of a random series of shootings in which six people were killed. A prime suspect was apprehended by police without incident.

Economic history 

In the past, Kalamazoo was known for its production of windmills, mandolins, buggies, automobiles, cigars, stoves, paper, and paper products. Agriculturally, it once was noted for celery. Although much of it has become suburbanized, the surrounding area still produces farm crops, primarily corn and soybeans.

Kalamazoo was the original home of Gibson Guitar Corporation, which spawned the still-local Heritage Guitars. The company was incorporated as "Gibson Mandolin - Guitar Co., Ltd" on October 11, 1902, by the craftsman Orville Gibson. One budget model was named the Gibson Kalamazoo "Melody Maker" Electric Guitar. Operations were moved gradually from Kalamazoo to Memphis, Tennessee, (Electric Division) and Bozeman, Montana, (Acoustic Division) in the 1980s. Some workers from the original factory stayed in Kalamazoo to create the Heritage Guitar company.

Kalamazoo was once known as the "Paper City" because of the paper mills in and near the city. The Allied Paper Corporation operated several mills and employed 1,300 people in Kalamazoo during the late 1960s. As the forests of West Michigan were logged, paper mills closed.

Early in the 20th century, Kalamazoo was home to the brass era automobile company Barley.

Kalamazoo was also headquarters of the Checker Motors Company, the former manufacturer of the Checker Cab, which also stamped sheet metal parts for other auto manufacturers. Checker closed on June 25, 2009, a victim of the Late-2000s recession.

Geography 
Several small tributaries of the Kalamazoo River, including Arcadia Creek and Portage Creek, wind through the city. The northeastern portion of Kalamazoo sits in the broad, flat Kalamazoo Valley, while the western portions of Kalamazoo climb into low hills to the west and south. Several small lakes are found throughout the area.

Kalamazoo's suburban population is located primarily to the south, in the city of Portage, and to the west in Oshtemo and Texas townships.

At least part of the municipal water supply for Kalamazoo is provided by the watershed contained within the Al Sabo Preserve in Texas Charter Township, Michigan, immediately southwest of Kalamazoo.

Another watershed, Kleinstuck Marsh, is popular with hikers and birdwatchers. Kleinstuck Marsh is south of Maple Street, between Oakland Drive and Westnedge Avenue, Kalamazoo's major north-south artery.

Climate 
Kalamazoo has a humid continental (Köppen Dfa) climate. Summers can be hot, humid, and relatively long, comprising the months of May to September. Tornadoes are rare but possible in Kalamazoo. In fact, in 1980, a major tornado ripped through downtown Kalamazoo causing extensive damage. In winter, temperatures occasionally plummet below 0 °F (-18°). Kalamazoo has been known for brutal snow storms as late as early April, but there are occasional winter days with no snow cover on the ground at all. Lake-effect snowstorms are commonplace in the winter.

Demographics 

As of 2000, the median income for a household in the city was $31,189, and the median income for a family was $42,438. Males had a median income of $32,160 versus $25,532 for females. The per capita income for the city was $16,897. About 13.6% of families and 24.3% of the population were below the poverty line, including 26.0% of those under age 18 and 11.3% of those age 65 or over.

2010 census 
As of the census of 2010, there were 74,262 people, 29,141 households, and 13,453 families residing in the city. The racial makeup of the city was 68.1% White, 22.2% African American, 0.5% Native American, 1.7% Asian, 2.8% from other races, and 4.6% from two or more races. Hispanic or Latino of any race were 6.4% of the population.

There were 29,141 households, of which 25.8% had children under the age of 18 living with them, 26.1% were married couples living together, 15.6% had a female householder with no husband present, 4.5% had a male householder with no wife present, and 53.8% were non-families. 36.8% of all households were made up of individuals, and 9.3% had someone living alone who was 65 years of age or older. The average household size was 2.29 and the average family size was 3.04.

The median age in the city was 26.2 years. 20.5% of residents were under the age of 18; 27% were between the ages of 18 and 24; 24.9% were from 25 to 44; 18.2% were from 45 to 64; and 9.4% were 65 years of age or older. The gender makeup of the city was 49.3% male and 50.7% female.

Neighborhoods 

The city of Kalamazoo is commonly divided into 22 neighborhoods, many of which are served by a neighborhood association. The Neighborhood Development Division of the city's government works with these associations to invest federal, state, and local funds, including those from the Community Development Block Grant program, in community improvements and economic growth.

Economy 

In 2007, Kalamazoo was named to Fast Company's 'Fast 50: Most Innovative Companies 2007', in recognition of the city's community capitalism approach to revitalize the economy. In 2012 Kiplinger's Personal Finance ranked Kalamazoo fourth of the Ten Best Cities for Cheapskates. The city was named in NerdWallet.com's 2014 'Top 10 Best Cities for Work-Life Balance'.

Breweries 
Kalamazoo has many local breweries and brewpubs that produce a variety of beer styles.

Perhaps the best-known is Bell's Brewery, established as the Kalamazoo Brewing Company in 1985 by Larry Bell. The brewery has expanded from its original Kalamazoo location, which houses the Eccentric Cafe, to another brewery in nearby Comstock Charter Township. Bell's beer is distributed to 40 US states, Washington DC and Puerto Rico. On a smaller scale, Olde Peninsula Brewpub, Bravo! restaurant, and Bilbo's Pizza and Brewing Company serve their own brews. The area is also a hotbed for home brewing and partners with neighboring Grand Rapids to form what is widely considered one of America's more important regions in American craft beer explosion. In recent years, at least two community events have evolved from the growing craft beer industry in the Kalamazoo area (Kalamazoo Beer Week (annual), Kalamazoo Craft Beer Festival). In 2015, the Give a Craft beer trail and passport were introduced. A shuttle bus (Kalamazoo Brew Bus) service and party bike tour service became available in 2016.

Distilleries 
In 2015, Rupert's Brew House entered the Kalamazoo craft spirits market. Two additional distilleries, Green Door Distilling, formerly Revival Distilling and Kalamazoo Distilling Company, are in the licensing stage.

Flavorings 
The A.M. Todd Company, one of the lead producers of peppermint oil and other flavorings, is headquartered in Kalamazoo. Its founder, Albert M. Todd, was elected to the United States House of Representatives for the 55th Congress.

Kalamazoo is also home to Kalsec, another flavorings company, which was founded by Paul H. Todd Jr., Albert Todd's grandson and U.S. Representative in the 89th Congress. Founded as the Kalamazoo Spice Extraction Company, Kalsec is owned and managed by Todd family descendants.

Manufacturing 
Stryker Corporation is Kalamazoo-based and makes medical equipment.

Kalamazoo Outdoor Gourmet designs and manufactures outdoor kitchen equipment.

Fabri-Kal, a supplier of food service and other containers produced from thermoform plastic or plant-based materials (Greenware product line), has operated corporate headquarters in Kalamazoo since the 1960s. The company closed the Kalamazoo-based manufacturing facilities in 1991, but returned an expanded manufacturing capacity to Kalamazoo in 2008 with the opening of a LEED-certified  facility. In recent years, the company's product lines have introduced sustainable and plant-based materials, and innovations to reduce the plastic content of consumer and other packaging.

Parker Hannifin Aerospace's Hydraulic Systems Division (HSD) is located at 2220 Palmer Ave in Kalamazoo, Michigan. The 170,000-square foot facility designs, manufactures, and services hydraulic components for both military and commercial aerospace sectors. It produces hydraulic axial piston pumps and motors, electric motor-driven pumps, hydraulic power transfer/supply units, electrohydraulic power modules, hydraulic thrust-reverser & landing gear actuators, accumulators, reservoirs, filter modules and valve packs.

Life sciences 
The Upjohn Company was a pharmaceutical research and manufacturing firm founded in 1886 in Kalamazoo; through a series of mergers and acquisitions that took place between 1995 and 2003, the Upjohn Company assets became a part of the Pfizer Corporation. Most of Upjohn's original facilities remain, many have been renovated and some new buildings have been constructed. The bulk of the former Upjohn Company facilities in the area exist in Portage, under Pfizer or Zoetis operation; others, located in downtown Kalamazoo, have been re-purposed as the campus of the Western Michigan University Homer Stryker M.D. School of Medicine, the research and development headquarters of Zoetis, and office space for Bronson Methodist Hospital.

Western Michigan University Homer Stryker M.D. School of Medicine (WMed) is a collaboration involving Western Michigan University and Kalamazoo's two teaching hospitals, Ascension Borgess  and Bronson Methodist. The new medical school has been in planning since 2008, and was granted Preliminary Accreditation from the Liaison Committee on Medical Education in October 2012. Welcoming its first class in August 2014, the school is a private 501(c)(3) nonprofit corporation supported by private gifts, clinical revenue, research activity, student tuition, and endowment income. In March 2011, Western Michigan University received a gift of $100 million for the medical school from anonymous donors.

The global Research and Development organization of Zoetis, the world's largest producer of medicine and vaccinations for pets and livestock, is headquartered in downtown Kalamazoo.

The city is also home to the Stryker Corporation, a surgical and medical devices manufacturer.

Kalamazoo hospitals include: Kalamazoo Regional Psychiatric Hospital, Bronson Methodist Hospital, and Ascension Borgess Hospital.

Industrial design 

In 2014, Newell Rubbermaid established a global product design center in Kalamazoo, consolidating fifteen global design units at a single location within the Western Michigan University Business Technology and Research Park. The Business Technology and Research Park is also home to design firm TEKNA Solutions. In 2015, Kalamazoo-based landscape design and manufacturing firm Landscape Forms, Inc., received five National Design Awards.

Research and economic development 
The W. E. Upjohn Institute for Employment Research, a nonpartisan, not-for-profit research organization, has operated in Kalamazoo since its establishment in 1945. The Institute conducts research into the causes and effects of unemployment, and measures for the alleviation of unemployment. The Institute also publishes Business Outlook for West Michigan, a quarterly journal that provides economic analysis and forecasts on the West Michigan economy.

The Fetzer Institute promotes and funds holistic solutions to everyday problems.  It was founded by John Fetzer, a broadcasting magnate and former owner of the Detroit Tigers and WKZO radio and television in Kalamazoo.

The economic development organization Southwest Michigan First was established in Kalamazoo in 1999, with a focus on community capitalism. The organization was recognized as a Best and Brightest Company to Work For in 2013, and has received Fast Company commendations for innovative strategies to improve the economy. In 2015, two members of Southwest Michigan First were selected for Development Counsellors International's "2015 40 under 40,"  top 40 young economic developers in the United States.

Businesses 
Other notable Kalamazoo businesses include:
 PNC Bank—Kalamazoo was formerly the corporate HQ of First of America Bank, which merged with National City Bank in 1997. National City has since been purchased and merged with PNC Bank which still maintains a large corporate building in Texas Township, and several locations downtown, along with numerous branches in the region.
 Henderson Castle, an 1895 Queen Anne-Style house that sits on West Main Hill across from Mountain Home cemetery, overlooking the city. It is privately owned but open to the public and currently functioning as a bed and breakfast, restaurant and spa.

Government 
Kalamazoo government is administered under a commission-manager style of government. The city commission is the representative body of the city, and consists of seven members—six city commissioners and a separately elected mayor—elected on a staggered non-partisan basis every four years. Whoever receives the most votes during an election becomes vice mayor of the city for the first two years of their term until a new vice mayor is selected. The current City Commission consists of Mayor David Anderson, Vice Mayor Don Cooney, and commissioners Jeanne Hess, Chris Praedel, Qianna Decker, Stephanie Hoffman, and Esteven Juarez.  The current mayor, David F. Anderson, was elected to a second term on November 2, 2021, beating Ben Stanley with 78.7% of the vote.

The vice mayor of Kalamazoo is Don Cooney, who won election in 2021 with 69.37% of the vote.

The city manager is the city's chief administrative officer. The manager is hired by, and answers to, the city commission.

Crime
Kalamazoo has a higher crime rate than the national average. Crime is spread throughout Kalamazoo and is especially high in the inner neighborhoods such as Edison, the Northside and Vine. Crime is lower in the downtown area and most of the southwest area. The aggravated assault rate in 2015 was 793.3 per 100,000—3.3 times the national average. The murder rate was 12.5 per 100,000 in 2010 and 7.9 in 2014. The 2016 Kalamazoo shootings by Uber driver Jason Dalton claimed 6 lives and caused 2 serious injuries in Kalamazoo County. Between 2008 and 2013 firearms were involved in 61% of homicides in Kalamazoo county compared to 77% statewide.

Education 

Kalamazoo is home to Western Michigan University. The college has four campuses in Kalamazoo, (West Campus, East Campus, Parkview Campus and Oakland Drive Campus) as well as several regional locations throughout Michigan and two in Florida. West Campus, located just west of downtown, has the largest concentration of university students, programs and school services. In 2005, Western Michigan ranked as the no. 2 wireless campus in the United States, per a national survey done by the Intel Corporation. In 2014, the WMU Homer Stryker School of Medicine (WMed) opened, welcoming an inaugural class of 54 students.

Each May, WMU hosts the International Congress on Medieval Studies. Organized by the Medieval Institute's faculty and graduate students, the Congress brings some 3,000 professors and students from around the globe to present and discuss a variety of topics related to the Middle Ages.

Kalamazoo College, a private liberal arts college founded in 1833, is located on a hill opposite WMU's original campus.

Kalamazoo is home to Kalamazoo Valley Community College, Davenport University, and Kalamazoo Area Mathematics and Science Center (KAMSC). Construction of the new Kalamazoo Valley Community College Culinary and Allied Health campus began in August 2014. It had also been the home of Nazareth College, which closed in 1992.

K-12 education
The public schools for the vast majority of Kalamazoo are managed by Kalamazoo Public Schools. Every resident graduate of the Kalamazoo Public Schools is provided with a scholarship for up to 100% of tuition and mandatory fee costs for four years at any public university or community college in Michigan, starting with the class of 2006. This program is known as the Kalamazoo Promise.

Small sections of Kalamazoo are in other school districts:  Parchment School District, Comstock Public Schools and Portage Public Schools.

Culture 

The city has an Arts Council. On the first Friday of each month, the council organizes the 'Art Hop'. Art Hop is a free event, during which downtown businesses and galleries display works by local artists, and patrons 'hop' from venue to venue, enjoying art, live music, and the chance to interact with local artists. A popular site during Art Hop is the Park Trades Center, which houses the Kalamazoo Book Arts Center, Glass Art Kalamazoo, and many other studios.

On New Year's Eve, downtown Kalamazoo is the site of an annual New Year's Fest celebration. This celebration is centered at Bronson Park and surrounding venues, allowing patrons to walk from venue to venue to enjoy an all ages showcase of performing arts and other activities (music, magic, comedy, exhibitions, fireworks, food). Initiated in 1985, the event has grown in scope and popularity.

Music groups and other performing artists perform at the downtown State Theatre, Western Michigan University's Miller Auditorium, and Wings Event Center.

The annual "Eccentric Day" at Bell's Eccentric Cafe celebrates the brewery's Eccentric Ale on the December Friday that marks the end of finals at Western Michigan University.

The Moped Army was founded in Kalamazoo in 1997.

There is no longer a zoo in Kalamazoo. The Milham Park Zoo closed in 1974.

Next to Milham Park is the Milham Park Golf Course. Completed in 1936, the 18-hole, par-72 course is entirely within the city limits of Kalamazoo. During winter, sledding and cross-country skiing are popular activities at the golf course (free of charge). In recent years, the Kalamazoo Nordic Skiers club has groomed and maintained skate ski and classic ski trails for community use.

In 2002, the Kalamazoo Public Library was named "Library of the Year" by Library Journal. The library includes a main location and four branch libraries, and until 2010, a bookmobile system. In 2014, the library opened 'The Hub', a digital lab open to the public for digitizing photos and video, producing podcasts, preserving old vinyl records, cassettes and VHS tapes, and other services.

Kalamazoo's theaters and performing groups include the Kalamazoo Civic Players, New Vic Theatre, Farmers Alley Theatre, Crawlspace Theatre Productions, The State Theater, and the Barn Theatre in nearby Augusta.  Plays and musicals are also performed at Kalamazoo College and Western Michigan University.

Animation festival 
A project of Kalamazoo Valley Community College, The Kalamazoo Animation Festival International (KAFI) encourages and educates animation artists, promotes Kalamazoo's animation industry, and provides community entertainment. In addition to a biannual festival, KAFI sponsors events such as film screenings and workshops throughout the year.

KAFI's first festival drew 235 submissions and nearly 1,000 attendees in 2002. A second festival was held in 2003. Since then, an every-other-year schedule has been adopted. The 2007 festival attracted more than 500 entries from 37 countries. In addition to an animated film competition with $15,000 in prizes awarded, the festival features events for students, artists, educators, filmmakers and the general public. Past KAFI award winners include Bill Plympton, Chris Landreth and John Canemaker.

Museums 
The city's most prominent art museum is the Kalamazoo Institute of Arts, whose collection has more than 3,600 works and a focus on 20th-century American art. The KIA regularly mounts temporary exhibitions.

The Kalamazoo Valley Museum, established in 1881, is an American Association of Museums accredited museum operated by Kalamazoo Valley Community College. The museum features "hands-on" exhibits aimed largely at children, and has a planetarium and a Challenger Learning Center.

Northeast of town, in Hickory Corners, is the Gilmore Car Museum, which includes cars used in Walt Disney movies.

The Kalamazoo Air Zoo, just south of town, has several dozen aircraft on display, from biplanes to jets.

Music 
The Gibson Guitar Corporation, founded in Kalamazoo in 1902, spurred local musicians to play a wide variety of styles, from classical and folk to modern rock (the company relocated to Nashville in 1984). The Kalamazoo Symphony Orchestra, founded in 1921, is directed by Raymond Harvey. The city also hosts the Irving S. Gilmore International Keyboard Festival, a Bach Festival, the Michigan Festival of Sacred Music, and the Stulberg International String Competition.

The local and indie music scene has produced pop stars such as RCA recording artists The Verve Pipe and Metal Blade recording artists Thought Industry. Kalamazoo is also host to the Kalamashoegazer music festival, held for the last 13 years and a showcase for both local and national shoegaze and dream pop bands.

Sports 

Kalamazoo plays host to three non-collegiate teams:
 The Kalamazoo Growlers Summer Collegiate baseball team plays games in Homer Stryker Field. The team is currently a member of the Northwoods League.
 The Kalamazoo Wings (aka K-Wings) minor league hockey team play games in Wings Event Center and has played since 1974. The team is currently a member of the ECHL, a development league for the NHL.
 The Kalamazoo FC, a National Premier Soccer League team, was established in 2016.

The Western Michigan University Broncos, who compete in the NCAA Division I Mid-American Conference, play at the following on-campus venues:
 Waldo Stadium (football)
 Lawson Arena (hockey)
 University Arena (basketball and Volleyball)
 Hyames Field (baseball)
 Ebert Field (softball)
 Kanley Track (outdoor track and field)

Hyames Field played host to the first two College World Series held in 1947 and 1948. Future U. S. President George H. W. Bush was a first baseman for Yale in the 1947 series.

The Kalamazoo College Hornets and Kalamazoo Valley Community College Cougars also have several collegiate athletic teams.

Kalamazoo is the hometown of former New York Yankees shortstop Derek Jeter, former NFL wide receiver Greg Jennings, former NFL running back T. J. Duckett, the world's number one prize money winning pro bass fisherman Kevin VanDam, former MLB pitcher Scott Olsen, former NHL player Adam Hall and former Chicago White Sox first baseman Mike Squires. Kalamazoo was also the hometown of longtime Detroit Tigers owner John Fetzer, who owned the American League team from 1961 through 1984, when he sold the franchise to Domino's Pizza founder Tom Monaghan.

The United States Tennis Association Boys 18 and 16 National Tennis Championships are hosted every summer by Kalamazoo College. The event has featured such players as Jimmy Connors, John McEnroe, Jim Courier, Andre Agassi, Pete Sampras, Michael Chang, James Blake and Andy Roddick, before they turned professional.

The Kalamazoo Rugby Football Club, founded in 1988, competes in the Michigan Rugby Football Union.

Since 2006, Wings Event Center has been the home of the Kalamazoo Derby Darlins roller derby league teams. Following up on successful events in 2010 and 2015, Wings Event Center and the Kalamazoo Curling Club will host the 2019 U.S. National Curling Championship.

The annual Kalamazoo Marathon, a USA Track & Field-certified and Boston Marathon-qualifying event, is part of a weekend of running and walking events.

In 1984–1986, the Kalamazoo Kangaroos, a Major Indoor Soccer League (MISL) team, played in Kalamazoo.

Local media

Newspapers 
Kalamazoo is served by one daily newspaper, the Kalamazoo Gazette, which now prints three editions weekly as of early 2012.  Business Review Western Michigan, a business-to-business publication headquartered in Kalamazoo, covering Western Michigan news, was rolled into MLive online coverage in late 2012. The ultimate parent company of both the Gazette and Business Review are Advance Publications, Inc.

Television 
WWMT, West Michigan's CBS / CW affiliate, is licensed and operates out of Kalamazoo but serves the entire West Michigan region. The station was originally owned and operated by famous broadcasting pioneer (and former Detroit Tigers owner) John Fetzer, as "WKZO-TV". Along with television, Fetzer introduced Kalamazoo to radio in 1931, when AM 590 WKZO signed on the air. Fetzer also created Kalamazoo's first cable television system, then known as Fetzer Cablevision; it is a predecessor of Kalamazoo's current cable franchise, Charter Communications.

Public Media Network, located in downtown Kalamazoo, hosts media outlets including Charter cable channels 187-191 where daily public access programs are produced and aired to the public.

Kalamazoo is part of the West Michigan television market, which also includes Grand Rapids and Battle Creek. Most channels that serve the entire market are receivable in Kalamazoo, including WWMT, WOOD-TV (NBC), WXMI (Fox), WZPX (Ion) and WLLA (religious). Some channels based in the northern part of the market reach Kalamazoo through a satellite or translator, such as WTLJ Muskegon (religious, through W26BX), WGVU-TV Grand Rapids (PBS, through WGVK), and WXSP-CD Grand Rapids (MyNetworkTV, through WOKZ-CA). WOTV in Battle Creek broadcasts ABC programming for the southern part of the market, including Kalamazoo. Charter offers all West Michigan channels on its system to Kalamazoo subscribers, including WZZM, the ABC affiliate for Grand Rapids and the northern part of the market.

Radio 

WIDR is the college student-run, commercial free radio station at Western Michigan University. It is known for playing obscure and underground music of all genres as well as some local news and talk. Broadcasting 100 watts on 89.1 FM, WIDR can be heard from about a 20-mile radius from campus.

WMUK is also on Western Michigan University's campus. It hosts many local music programs including jazz and classical performances as well as programming from NPR. WMUK broadcasts 50,000 watts in high definition on 102.1 FM.

WKDS is West Michigan's only high school student-run radio station. The station signed on in 1983 at 89.9 on the FM dial, broadcasting from Loy Norrix High School. The call letters stood for Kalamazoo District Schools (now Kalamazoo Public Schools). For most of its history, WKDS broadcast only during daytime hours and not at all on the weekend. In Fall of 2004, the station began broadcasting 24 hours a day, 7 days a week in an attempt to prevent an outside organization to take over the time WKDS was off the air. WKDS was part of a county wide Education For Employment program for years. The radio station is still owned by Kalamazoo Public Schools although the EFE program has been discontinued. High school students from around the area continue to operate the station.

FM radio stations that originate or can be heard over the air in Kalamazoo:

 WCXK 88.3  - Kalamazoo              - Christian Adult Contemporary
 WIDR 89.1  - Kalamazoo              - College/Variety
 WKDS 89.9  - Kalamazoo              - High School/Variety
 WCSG 91.3  - Grand Rapids           - Christian Adult Contemporary
 WZUU 92.5 - Mattawan/Kalamazoo - Classic Rock
 WBCT 93.7  - Grand Rapids           - Country
 WWDK 94.1 - Jackson/Lansing/Battle Creek/Kalamazoo   - Classic Country
 WKLQ 94.5 - Grand Rapids - Adult Album Alternative
 W238AL 95.5 - Kalamazoo - Urban Adult Contemporary (FM translator for AM 1560)
 WLKM-FM 95.9  - Three Rivers           - Adult Contemporary
 WMAX-FM 96.1 - Holland/Grand Rapids - Sports
 WZOX 96.5  - Portage/Kalamazoo      - Modern Adult Contemporary
 WGRD 97.9  - Grand Rapids           - Mainstream Rock
 WNWN 98.5  - Coldwater/Battle Creek/Kalamazoo           - Country
 WBCH-FM 100.1 - Hastings               - Country
 WQXC 100.9 - Otsego/Kalamazoo       - Oldies
 WMUK 102.1 - Kalamazoo - NPR/Talk/Classical/Jazz
 WKFR-HD2 102.5 - Kalamazoo - Classic Hits (FM translator for WKFR-HD sub-channel)
 WYHA 102.9 - Grand Rapids - Christian
 WKFR 103.3 - Battle Creek/Kalamazoo - CHR/Top 40
 WVGR 104.1 - Grand Rapids - NPR/Talk
 WBXX 104.9 - Marshall/Battle Creek           - Alternative Rock
 WSRW 105.7 - Grand Rapids           - Adult Contemporary
 WJXQ 106.1 - Jackson/Lansing/Battle Creek        - Mainstream Rock
 WVFM 106.5 - Kalamazoo - Variety Hits
 WKZO 106.9 - Kalamazoo - News/Talk (FM translator for AM 590)
 WTNR 107.3 - Greenville/Grand Rapids - Country
 WRKR 107.7 - Portage/Battle Creek/Kalamazoo - Classic Rock

AM radio stations that originate or can be heard over the air in Kalamazoo:

 WKZO 590 - Kalamazoo - News/Talk - (FM translator at 106.9)
 WAKV 980 - Allegan/Otsego - Adult Standards
 WKMI 1360 - Kalamazoo - Talk
 WTOU 1660 - Kalamazoo - Urban Adult Contemporary

Transportation

Highways 

 north of downtown Kalamazoo

Kalamazoo is served by highways I-94, US 131, M-96 and M-343. It was on the original Territorial Road in Michigan of the 19th century, which started in Detroit and ran to Lake Michigan. Much of that, but not all, later became Old US 12—the "old" designation came about when I-94 was built parallel to it—and also was called Red Arrow Highway after a World War I army division. The name "US 12" was shifted south to what once was US 112 between Detroit and New Buffalo. Some parts of Old US 12 outside of town, especially in Van Buren and Berrien counties to the west, are still called Red Arrow Highway. The term "Old US 12" has faded from use.

Rail 

 Kalamazoo has rail service provided by Amtrak, with the station located downtown and combined with a newly renovated bus terminal. Kalamazoo serves as the hub and largest city in Amtrak's only high-speed corridor outside the Northeast, with  service between Porter, Indiana and Albion, Michigan.
 Kalamazoo also has a freight service provided by Grand Elk Railroad running north to Grand Rapids, Michigan and south to Elkhart, Indiana. The line they lease was a former Grand Rapids and Indiana Railroad mainline.

Bus 
 Bus service to and through the city is provided by Greyhound, Indian Trails and the Kalamazoo trolley.
 Public bus services within the city are provided by Metro Transit.

Air 
 On the southern end of the city is the Kalamazoo/Battle Creek International Airport (AZO), which offers flights on various airlines to hubs and leisure destinations. Construction of a new $36 million terminal was completed in 2011.

Other 
The Kal-Haven Trail, heavily used by cyclists, runners, walkers, and snowmobilers, extends to downtown Kalamazoo. It runs  between South Haven, to a trailhead just west of Kalamazoo. Between that trailhead and South Haven the trail is run by Van Buren County, even the parts within Kalamazoo County. A trail pass is no longer required. The Kal-Haven is a rail trail, built on the former right-of-way of the Kalamazoo and South Haven Railroad.

The section east of the trailhead was opened in 2008 and extends to downtown Kalamazoo. It's known as the Kalamazoo River Valley Trail and is run by Kalamazoo County. No pass is required on that section.

In popular culture 
Kalamazoo's name is a familiar reference in popular music, since its unique sound makes it a "great word for a lyric". Its use as metonym for a remote place is discussed above—"although when it comes to both Timbuktu and Kalamazoo, most of that brag-worthy exotic allure is merely in their names". Nonetheless, numerous songs use the city's name in their song title or lyrics.

Probably the most famous and first was "(I've Got a Gal In) Kalamazoo" (1942) by the Glenn Miller Orchestra with Tex Beneke. This #1 popular song was written by Mack Gordon and Harry Warren. The performance was recreated with Gene Morrison Orchestra as the Glenn Miller Orchestra and the Nicholas Brothers (doing a memorable dance) in the 1942 movie Orchestra Wives. This was nominated: Best Music, Original Song in Academy Awards) Harry Warren (music), Mack Gordon (lyrics). See 15th Academy Awards.

At least a dozen (and many more versions) of "Kalamazoo" songs have been recorded. In chronological order others include: "I've Been Everywhere" by Hank Snow (1962) (album of the same title) and Johnny Cash (1996) Unchained—reworked from the original 1959 Geoff Mack Australian-place-names version made popular by the singer Lucky Starr; "Down on the Corner" (1969) by Creedence Clearwater Revival on their fourth studio album, Willy and the Poor Boys—covered by a dozen other groups—though the reference is not to the city but to one of the "Kalamazoo" line of budget priced guitars manufactured by Gibson; "Kalamazoo" (1995) by Luna on Penthouse; "Cold Rock a Party" (1997) by MC Lyte on Bad As I Wanna B; "Kalamazoo" a song by the rock trio Primus on the 1997 Brown Album;  "Top of the World" by Rascalz (1999) on Global Warning; Andrew Peterson lost his luggage in Kalamazoo, according to the song "Isn't It Love" in his 2001 album, Clear to Venus. "Kalamazoo", a song by Ben Folds on the 2004 EP Super D; and "Kalamazoo" (2002) by Mike Craver on his album Shining Down.

The city was also mentioned in the opera Einstein on the Beach by Philip Glass and in the chorus of the song "Gotta Get Away" by The Black Keys, from their album Turn Blue ("I went from San Berdoo to Kalamazoo/Just to get away from you..."). Like Miller, the Creedence and Axton lyrics probably use the word "Kalamazoo" as an oblique reference to Gibson Guitars, which made various models named "Kalamazoo", all prominently adorned with the city's name as their origin.
In 2011 rap artist Young Jeezy mentioned the city in the song "Higher Learning" on his album TM:103 Hustlerz Ambition. In 2014 Kalamazoo was mentioned again by Rittz in the song "Bounce" on his album Next to Nothing.

The "Kalamazoo" was one of several names of a railroad Handcar, and was produced by the Kalamazoo Manufacturing Company.

In Dr. Seuss's classic children's book Horton Hatches the Egg, Horton the Elephant visits Kalamazoo while he is in the circus.

Comedian and political commentator Jordan Klepper was born in Kalamazoo.

Notable people

Sister cities 
The city of Kalamazoo, Michigan has three sister cities.

  Kingston, Jamaica
  Numazu, Shizuoka, Japan
  Pushkin, St. Petersburg, Russia

See also 

 List of mayors of Kalamazoo, Michigan
 Kalamazoo Department of Public Safety

References

External links 

 
 Kalamazoo Regional Chamber of Commerce
 Discover Kalamazoo Michigan
 

 
Cities in Kalamazoo County, Michigan
County seats in Michigan
Populated places established in 1831
1831 establishments in Michigan Territory